Geffroy is a French surname. Notable people with the surname include:

Georges Geffroy (1903–1971), French interior designer
Gustave Geffroy (1855–1926), French journalist, art critic and writer
Isabelle Geffroy (born 1980), French singer-songwriter
Mathieu Auguste Geffroy (1820–1895), French historian

French-language surnames